The South Pacific High is a semi-permanent subtropical anticyclone located in the southeast  Pacific Ocean. The area of high atmospheric pressure and the presence of the Humboldt Current in the underlying ocean make the west coast of Peru and northern Chile extremely arid. The Sechura and Atacama deserts, as the whole climate of Chile, are heavily influenced by this semi-permanent high-pressure area. This high-pressure system plays a major role in the El Niño–Southern Oscillation (ENSO), and it is also a major source of trade winds across the equatorial Pacific.

See also

 North Pacific High
 El Niño–Southern Oscillation
 Trade winds
 Humboldt Current

References

External links
  

Climate of Argentina
Climate of Chile
Regional climate effects
Pacific Ocean
Anticyclones